Chorula  (German Chorulla, 1934-45: Steinfurt O.S.) is a village in the administrative district of Gmina Gogolin, within Krapkowice County, Opole Voivodeship, in south-western Poland.

The village has a population of 440.

References

Villages in Krapkowice County